Felice Salis (8 July 1938 – 2 December 2021) was an Italian field hockey player. He competed in the men's tournament at the 1960 Summer Olympics. Salis died on 2 December 2021, at the age of 83.

References

External links
 

1938 births
2021 deaths
Field hockey players at the 1960 Summer Olympics
Italian male field hockey players
Olympic field hockey players of Italy
Sportspeople from Cagliari